Endurance Ojokolo (born 29 September 1975 in London, United Kingdom) is a former Nigerian athlete who specialized in the 100 metres.

Achievements

Personal bests
60 metres - 7.08 s (1999, indoor)
100 metres - 11.06 s (2001)
200 metres - 23.09 s (1999)

References

External links

1975 births
Living people
Nigerian female sprinters
Athletes (track and field) at the 2004 Summer Olympics
Olympic athletes of Nigeria
Athletes (track and field) at the 2006 Commonwealth Games
Commonwealth Games competitors for Nigeria
Athletes from London
English people of Nigerian descent
African Games gold medalists for Nigeria
African Games medalists in athletics (track and field)
African Games silver medalists for Nigeria
African Games bronze medalists for Nigeria
Athletes (track and field) at the 1999 All-Africa Games
Athletes (track and field) at the 2003 All-Africa Games
Athletes (track and field) at the 2007 All-Africa Games
Olympic female sprinters